Laila Soliman (ليلى سليمان, born 1981) is an Egyptian writer and theater director living and working in Cairo.

She was born in Cairo and received a degree in theater and Arabic literature from the American University in Cairo in 2004. She received an MA in theater from the Academy of Theatre and Dance at the Amsterdam University of the Arts.

In 2014, her play Hawa Elhorreya ("Whims of Freedom") about the Egyptian revolution of 1919 was presented at the Egyptian Centre for Culture and Arts and at the London International Festival of Theatre.

Soliman does not have a theatre company but instead people join in her projects as collaborators. She takes on various functions herself in support of her projects as required, including publicity, fundraising and set and costume design.

Her works have been presented in Egypt, Syria, Lebanon and various countries in Europe.

Selected works

Plays 
 The Retreating World (2004) by Naomi Wallace
 Ghorba, Images of Alienation (2006)
 Egyptian Products (2008)
 …At Your Service! (2009)
 Spring Awakening in the Tuktuk (2010)
 No Time for Art, series (2011)
 Here, There & Everywhere (2013)
 La Grande Maison (2015)
 The National Museum of the State Security System (2015)
 Zigzig (2016)

References

21st-century Egyptian women writers
1981 births
Living people
Egyptian dramatists and playwrights
Egyptian theatre directors
The American University in Cairo
Writers from Cairo